Globalist may refer to

Globalism, a political ideology related to interconnections across the world
New World Order (conspiracy theory), which espouses that malicious agents (sometimes called "globalists") are attempting to form a world government
The Globalist, an American political online magazine
The Yale Globalist, an American political magazine from Yale University
"The Globalist" (song), a 2015 song by English rock band Muse